Ali Hussein Kandil ( ʿAlī Qandīl) is an Egyptian former football referee.  He directed the match between Korea DPR and Chile in the 1966 FIFA World Cup which ended in a 1-all draw.
He was also the referee for the controversial Mexico-El Salvador game at the 1970 FIFA World Cup. Just before half time Mexico's scored their first goal, it appeared to be unclear whether Kandil had signaled a foul for Mexico or a throw in for El Salvador.  The El Salvador players protested by refusing to resume the game, continually moving the ball from the centre spot. Their captain Salvador Mariona eventually kicking the ball from the centre circle over the touch line. Kandil signaled for half time. After half time Mexico added three more goals and won 4-0.

References

External links 
 
 
 

1920 births
Living people
1966 FIFA World Cup referees
1970 FIFA World Cup referees
Egyptian football referees
FIFA World Cup referees